What Is There to Say? is a 1959 album by Gerry Mulligan.

Reception

Allmusic's Scott Yanow states: "The last of the pianoless quartet albums that Gerry Mulligan recorded in the 1950s is one of the best", and observes that "Virtually every selection is memorable, with 'What Is There to Say,' 'Just in Time,' 'Festive Minor,' 'My Funny Valentine,' and 'Utter Chaos' being the high points".

Track listing
All tracks composed by Gerry Mulligan except where indicated
 "What Is There to Say?" (Vernon Duke, E.Y. "Yip" Harburg) – 4:03
 "Just in Time" (Jule Styne, Betty Comden, Adolph Green) – 4:11
 "News from Blueport" (Art Farmer)  – 5:03
 "Festive Minor"  – 6:14
 "As Catch Can"  – 3:54
 "My Funny Valentine" (Richard Rodgers, Lorenz Hart) – 4:06
 "Blueport" (Bill Crow) – 8:47
 "Utter Chaos"  – 4:23

Recording dates
17 December 1958 (7); 23 December 1958 (5, 6, 8); 15 January 1959 (1, 2, 3, 4)

Personnel
Gerry Mulligan - baritone saxophone
Art Farmer - trumpet
Bill Crow - bass
Dave Bailey - drums

References

1959 albums
Albums produced by Teo Macero
Sony Records albums
Albums recorded at CBS 30th Street Studio
Columbia Records albums